Banville is a commune in the Calvados department in the Normandy region of north-western France.

The inhabitants of the commune are known as Banvillais or Banvillaises.

Geography
Banville is located in the Bessin area some 3 km south-west of Courseulles-sur-Mer and 5 km east of Crépon. Access to the commune is by the D12 road from Graye-sur-Mer in the north which passes through the village and continues south-west to Tierceville. The D112A goes west from the village to Sainte-Croix-sur-Mer. The commune is mostly farmland but with a significant sized residential area.

The Seulles river forms the entire eastern border of the commune as it flows north to the English Channel at Courseulles-sur-Mer.

Neighbouring communes and villages

History
During the invasion of Normandy Banville was located within 3 kilometres of Juno Beach (Mike sector), the landing zone for Canadian troops. The village was liberated on the 6 June 1944 by the Royal Winnipeg Rifles.

Heraldry

Administration

List of Successive Mayors

Demography
In 2017 the commune had 792 inhabitants.

Culture and heritage

Civil heritage
The commune has many buildings and structures that are registered as historical monuments:
The Reviers Bridge (17th century)
The Hervot Farmhouse at 12 rue du Bout du Haut (1913)
A Farmhouse at 25 Rue du Camp Romain (18th century)
A Notable's House at 8 Rue du Marché (18th century)
A Lavoir (Public laundry) at Route de Reviers (19th century)
A Chateau (1545)
A Girls' Primary School (19th century)
The old Town Hall (19th century)
The Village (Neolithic)
Houses (18th-19th century)

Other sites of interest
The Roman Camp of La Burette.

Religious heritage
The commune has several religious buildings and structures that are registered as historical monuments:
A Presbytery at 10 Rue du Bout du Haut (18th century)
A Calvary at Route de Courseulles-Sur-Mer (1912)
The Parish Church of Saint-Lo (18th century)

The Church contains many items that are registered as historical objects:

A Stole (19th century)
A Ciborium (18th century)
A Monstrance (19th century)
A Way of the Cross (19th century)
A Chalice with Paten (19th century)
3 Processional Banners (19th century)
A Painting: Nativity (17th century)
A Statue: Virgin and child (17th century)
A Statue: Saint Nicolas de Bari (18th century)
A Cross: Christ on the Cross (18th century)
2 banks of Stalls (19th century)
A Paschal Candlestick (19th century)
A Rood beam (19th century)
A Baptismal font (16th century)
A set of 7 Stained glass windows: Seven Sacrements (1959)
A set of 6 Stained glass windows (1959)
The Furniture in the Church

Notable people linked to the commune

Théodore Faullain de Banville (1823-1891), French poet, the Faullain family of Banville were well established since the 1750s at Moulins (Allier), but were originally from the commune.

See also
Communes of the Calvados department

References

External links
Banville on Géoportail, National Geographic Institute (IGN) website 
Banville on the 1750 Cassini Map

Communes of Calvados (department)